The Forgan Smith Building is the centrepiece of the Great Court structure in the main campus of the University of Queensland in Brisbane, Australia.

History 
The construction of the building began in 1937, and it was finished in the early 1950s. Its construction was started as an economic stimulus project by the Premier of Queensland, William Forgan Smith, during the Great Depression.  It now carries Forgan Smith's name.

Description 
The building is 299 metres long, with a 22.7 metre central tower, with an Arts wing to its east, and a Law wing to its west, and a library and a great hall in both ends. The style of the building is described as "inter-war stripped classical style", as well as Art Deco.

References 

Buildings and structures in Brisbane
University of Queensland